The Sierra Nevada Ski Station is a ski resort in the Sierra Nevada in the province of Granada in southeastern Spain. The ski area is on the northwestern slopes of Veleta, the third highest peak in Peninsular Spain and the most southerly ski resort in Europe.

The resort hosted the FIS Alpine World Ski Championships in 1996 and occasionally hosts World Cup races, the last being the women's technical races in 2007. In recent years World Slope and Freestyle events have made a very successful appearance here. It was also host to the 2015 Winter Universiade, the world university games. In March 2017, Sierra Nevada hosted the FIS Freestyle Ski and Snowboarding World Championships.

Description
Sierra Nevada is Europe's southernmost ski resort, and the highest in Spain. With its high elevation, the skiing season can last from late November until early May. Particularly towards the end of the season it experiences sunny days of skiing, although wind can be a problem due to Veleta's prominence and few trees. The nearest bigger city is Málaga, is accessed by the highway A-7/European route E15 (Málaga-Motril), highway A-44/ European route E902 (Motril-Granada) and then route Granada-Sierra Nevada Ski Station.

At the foot of the slopes there is a resort village, Pradollano, which stretches up a hill to the north of the pistes. Pradollano is home to a large number of shops, including many that sell or rent ski equipment, souvenir shops and a small supermarket. There is also a variety of ski schools, restaurants, cafés, bars and nightclubs.

Here there are a few cafés and restaurants, a ski school, a few hire shops and lockers.

The resort is run by a private-public enterprise called Cetursa Sierra Nevada, S.A..

Activities
With abundant snow, it is possible to ski almost anywhere on the mountain, as the whole resort is above the tree line. The resort does not carry out avalanche blasting, and skiers are generally advised against leaving the pistes due to avalanche risk. Those looking for a real challenge could try the World Cup Giant Slalom run known as “Fuente del Tesoro”. As the resort mainly caters to locals, and less to people visiting for a whole week, it is much busier at weekends. There are rarely any queues mid-week outside the main Spanish holidays (first week of December, Christmas through to 6 January and Easter). Even at weekends, queues are generally fairly short by comparison to other European areas especially if the whole resort is open, allowing skiers to spread out across the mountain.

In recent years the resort has made an effort to increase the number of services it offers, including expanding the Mirlo Blanco recreation zone, which now has an ice rink, toboggans, ski-bikes, mini-skis and a track for wheeled toboggans. Some of the heaviest investments have been put into developing what is currently the longest Slope style line in Europe with over 71 modules and a possibility of linking 46 of them in one continuous line. In addition to this, the largest Half Pipe in the country has also been developed.

Summer activities include walking, cycling, horse-riding, and mountain climbing in the area. One of the cable cars and one chairlift are kept open in July and August, making it relatively easy for hikers to reach the summit of Veleta. On a clear day, you may be lucky enough to catch a glimpse of Africa from the peak of the mountain.

The service includes a guided commentary about the geology and ecology of the Sierra Nevada.

Transport
A bus service connects the resort to the main bus station in the city of Granada, with the journey taking approximately 45 minutes. The bus station is on Avenida de Juan Pablo II. During the skiing season, weekday buses run from the bus station to the resort at 08:00, 10:00 and 17:00, returning at 09:00, 16:00 and 18:30. At weekends and on public holidays they leave Granada at 08:00, 10:00, 15:00 and 17:00, and return at 09:00, 13:00, 16:00 and 18:30. Outside the skiing season, there is a daily bus to the resort at 09:00, while the bus back down leaves at 17:00.

There is also a minibus service that shuttles between the bottom and top of Pradollano, as well as a chair-lift suitable for non-skiers that connects the bottom, middle and top of the village.

Further information

The ski season normally lasts from the beginning of December until the end of April or beginning of May. Artificial snow machines now mean that the resort can open for skiing even when there is no natural snow. Andalusia has a very high proportion of sunny days even in the winter and usually it is possible to ski with beautiful blue skies and warm temperatures.

See also
Sierra Nevada National Park
Sierra Nevada
List of Sierra Nevada Ski Runs

References

External links 
  - 

Ski areas and resorts in Spain
Ski Station
Sports venues in Andalusia